"Motel" is the fifteenth single by B'z, released on November 21, 1994. This song is one of B'z many number-one singles in Oricon chart. It sold over 1,316,000 copies according to Oricon.

Usage in media
 Miki (Boutique JOY) Commercial Song (#1)

Track listing 
"Motel"
"Hole In My Heart"

Certifications

References

External links
B'z official website

1994 singles
B'z songs
Oricon Weekly number-one singles
Songs written by Tak Matsumoto
Songs written by Koshi Inaba
1994 songs
BMG Japan singles